Leighton Ira Davis (February 20, 1910 – May 6, 1995) was a lieutenant general in the United States Air Force.

Biography
Davis was born Leighton Ira Davis in Sparta, Wisconsin, in 1910. He would graduate from the Massachusetts Institute of Technology and later receive honorary doctorates from New Mexico State University and Brevard Engineering College. Davis died on May 6, 1995.

Career
Davis graduated from the United States Military Academy in 1935. In 1939 he became an instructor at the United States Military Academy. Later he served as Commandant of the Air Force Institute of Technology. In 1954 he was assigned to Holloman Air Force Base before serving with the Air Research and Development Command. He would go on to support Project Mercury. Later he was assigned to Patrick Air Force Base and Andrews Air Force Base. His retirement was effective as of August 1, 1968.

Awards he received include the Distinguished Service Medal, the Legion of Merit with oak leaf cluster, and the NASA Outstanding Leadership Medal.

References

People from Sparta, Wisconsin
Military personnel from Wisconsin
United States Air Force generals
Recipients of the Air Force Distinguished Service Medal
Recipients of the Legion of Merit
United States Military Academy alumni
Massachusetts Institute of Technology alumni
1995 deaths
1910 births
United States Army Air Forces personnel of World War II